Colombia seeks diplomatic and commercial relations with all countries, regardless of their ideologies or political or economic systems. For this reason, the Colombian economy is quite open, relying on international trade and following guidelines given by international law.

Since 2008, Colombia's Ministry of Trade and Commerce has either reached or strengthened Bilateral Trade Agreements with South Korea, Japan and China building stronger commerce interchange and development in the Pacific Rim.

Regional relations have also vastly improved under the Santos Administration (2010–2018). Issues however remain regarding spillover of the FARC leftist-terrorist group, being chased out of hiding in rural areas of Colombia and finding safe havens in non-monitored areas of bordering states. The FARC numbers have significantly diminished in the last decade, to an estimated 5,000–7,000. And while joint military collaboration has steadily increased with the bordering countries of Brazil, Panama, Peru, and Venezuela, there have been tensions between Colombia and Ecuador regarding the issue.  In 2002, the Ecuadorian government closed its main border crossing with Colombia, restricting its hours of operation. Ecuador continues to voice its concerns over an influx of émigrés stemming from guerilla activity at its borders. Evidence has since emerged however, suggesting that a significant number of the FARC's foot soldiers in and around the Colombia–Ecuador border consist of Ecuadorian émigrés who joined the leftist terrorist group out of need. Returning Ecuadorian émigrés have faced re-entry restrictions.

In 2012, relations with Nicaragua and Venezuela were tested over territorial island disputes. Bilateral committees are negotiating the dispute with Venezuela over waters in the Gulf of Venezuela.

Background
In 1969, Colombia formed what is now the Andean Community along with Bolivia, Chile, Ecuador, and Peru (Venezuela joined in 1973, and Chile left in 1976).

In the 1980s, Colombia broadened its bilateral and multilateral relations, joining the Contadora Group, the Group of Eight (now the Rio Group), and the Non-Aligned Movement, which it chaired from 1994 until September 1998. In addition, it has signed free trade agreements with Chile, Mexico, and Venezuela.

Colombia has traditionally played an active role in the United Nations and the Organization of American States and in their subsidiary agencies. Former President César Gaviria became Secretary General of the OAS in September 1994 and was reelected in 1999. Colombia was a participant in the December 1994 and April 1998 Summits of the Americas and followed up on initiatives developed at the summit by hosting two post-summit, ministerial-level meetings on trade and science and technology.

Colombia regularly participates in international fora, including CICAD, the Organization of American States' body on money laundering, chemical controls, and drug abuse prevention. Although the Colombian Government ratified the 1988 UN Convention on Narcotics in 1994—the last of the Andean governments to do so—it took important reservations, notably to the anti-money-laundering measures, asset forfeiture and confiscation provisions, maritime interdiction, and extradition clauses. Colombia subsequently withdrew some of its reservations, most notably a reservation on extradition.

International relations

Disputes – international
Maritime boundary dispute with Venezuela in the Gulf of Venezuela; territorial disputes with Nicaragua over Archipelago de San Andrés y Providencia and Quita Sueño Bank. The United States disputes sovereignty with Colombia over the Serranilla Bank and the Bajo Nuevo Bank. Quita Sueño Bank is claimed by the United States to be a submerged reef, and thus does not recognize the sovereignty of any nation over the bank.

Membership of international organizations
The major organizations in which Colombia is a member include: the Agency for the Prohibition of Nuclear Weapons in Latin America and the Caribbean, Andean Pact, Caribbean Development Bank Economic Commission for Latin America and the Caribbean, Food and Agriculture Organization of the United Nations, Group of 3, Group of 11, Group of 24, Group of 77, Inter-American Development Bank, International Atomic Energy Agency, International Bank for Reconstruction and Development, International Chamber of Commerce, International Civil Aviation Organization, International Criminal Police Organization (Interpol), International Development Association, International Finance Corporation, International Fund for Agricultural Development, International Labour Organization, International Maritime Organization, International Maritime Satellite Organization, International Monetary Fund (IMF), International Olympic Committee, International Organization for Migration, International Organization for Standardization, International Telecommunication Union, International Telecommunications Satellite Organization, International Trade Union Confederation, Latin American Economic System, Latin American Integration Association, Non-Aligned Movement, Organization of American States (OAS), Permanent Court of Arbitration, Rio Group, United Nations (UN), UN Conference on Trade and Development, UNESCO, UN Industrial Development Organization, UN Office of the High Commissioner for Refugees, Universal Postal Union, World Confederation of Labour, World Federation of Trade Unions, World Health Organization, World Intellectual Property Organization, World Meteorological Organization, World Tourism Organization, and World Trade Organization. An OAS observer has monitored the government's peace process with the paramilitaries, lending the negotiations much-needed international credibility. The United States helps Colombia secure favorable treatment from the IMF.

Major international treaties
Regional treaties include the Andean Pact, now known as the Andean Community, which also includes Bolivia, Ecuador, and Peru, the bodies and institutions making up the Andean Integration System (AIS). Colombia has signed free-trade agreements with Chile, Mexico, and Venezuela.

Its recent trade agreements with Korea, China and Japan, have focused on economic and technical cooperation between those nations. Within the regional Caribbean Community and Common Market (Caricom), Colombia has also deepened economic and medical science research collaboration agreements. Colombia has also signed and ratified 105 international treaties or agreements relating to the protection of the environment. These include the Antarctic Treaty and Nuclear Test Ban Treaty and conventions on Biodiversity, Desertification, Endangered Species, Hazardous Wastes, Marine Life Conservation, Ozone Layer Protection, Ship Pollution, Tropical Timber 83, Tropical Timber 94, and Wetlands. It has signed, but not ratified, the Antarctic-Environmental Protocol and conventions on Law of the Sea and Marine Dumping. Colombia also has signed the Treaty on the Non-Proliferation of Nuclear Weapons and the Tlatelolco Treaty. By 1975 signatories to the 1974 Declaration of Ayacucho, of which Colombia was one, had decided on limitations to nuclear, biological, and chemical weapons.

Gaining all 186 votes, Colombia served on the U.N. Security Council from 2011 to 2012 representing Latin American and the Caribbean.

Colombia is also a member of the International Criminal Court with a Bilateral Immunity Agreement of protection for the United States-military (as covered under Article 98).

Domestic politics and foreign policy 
International Relations scholars long emphasized international constraints, and particularly Colombia's relationship with the United States, as central to its foreign policy. In terms of foreign policy process, presidents have broad constitutional authorities, in consultation with their foreign ministers. However, since the 2000s, the influence of other domestic actors in Colombian foreign policy-making has increased. Long, Bitar, and Jiménez-Peña examine the role of the Colombian Constitutional Court, congressional politics, social movements, and electoral challengers. They find that Colombian institutions permit increasing challenges to presidential authority, and that in important cases Colombian presidents have been forced to drop their preferred foreign policies.

Bilateral relations

Africa

North & South America

Asia

Europe
Under the Uribe administration, Colombia's relations with the European Union (EU) have been cordial. Representatives of the EU have been critical of Colombia's antiguerrilla and antidrug strategies in several respects. The EU is particularly concerned about the potential for increased human rights abuses within Colombia at the hands of both government forces and illegal armed groups, and it has continued to distance itself from Plan Colombia. The EU is in favor of a negotiated solution to the nation's internal conflict. EU aid to Colombia has mainly consisted of social, economic and development investments.

In 2004, the EU as an entity did not offer unrestricted support for the Uribe government's peace initiative with paramilitaries, citing concerns over the possible lack of a credible and comprehensive peace strategy and its application, but it did approve US$2 million in aid for the process. Individual EU members such Sweden, Italy, Germany and the Netherlands also provided limited support on their own.

Oceania

Transnational issues

Narcotics and terrorism 
By the 1990s, Colombia had become the world's leading supplier of refined cocaine and a growing source for heroin. More than 90% of the cocaine that entered in the 1990s the United States was produced, processed, or transshipped in Colombia.

Despite the death of Medellín cartel drug kingpin Pablo Escobar in 1993 and the arrests of major Cali cartel leaders in 1995 and 1996, Colombian drug cartels remain among the most sophisticated criminal organizations in the world, controlling cocaine processing, international wholesale distribution chains, and markets. In 1999 Colombian police arrested over 30 narcotraffickers, most of them extraditable, in "Operation Millennium" involving extensive international cooperation. More arrests were made in a following "Operation Millennium II."

Colombia is engaged in a broad range of narcotics control activities. Through aerial spraying of herbicide and manual eradication, Colombia has attempted to keep coca, opium poppy, and cannabis cultivation from expanding. The government has committed itself to the eradication of all illicit crops, interdiction of drug shipments, and financial controls to prevent money laundering. Alternative development programs were introduced in 1999.

Corruption and intimidation by traffickers complicate the drug-control efforts of the institutions of government. Colombia passed revised criminal procedures code in 1993 that permits traffickers to surrender and negotiate lenient sentences in return for cooperating with prosecutors. In December 1996 and February 1997, however, the Colombian Congress passed legislation to toughen sentencing, asset forfeiture, and money-laundering penalties.

In November 1997, the Colombian Congress amended the constitution to permit the extradition of Colombian nationals, albeit not retroactively. In late 1999, President Pastrana authorized the first extradition in almost 10 years of a Colombian trafficker to stand trial for U.S. crimes. Three such extraditions to the United States have taken place, the most recent in August 2000, with cases against others pending in Colombian courts. Under the Pastrana administration, Plan Colombia was developed and implemented with U.S. backing.

During the presidency of Álvaro Uribe, the government applied more military pressure on the FARC and other outlawed groups. After the offensive, many security indicators improved. Colombia achieved a great decrease in cocaine production, leading White House drug czar R. Gil Kerlikowske to announce that Colombia is no longer the world's biggest producer of cocaine.

In addition to the challenge posed to the United States by Colombian drug trafficking, illegal Colombian immigrants in the United States are an issue in Colombia-U.S. relations. According to figures from the U.S. Department of Homeland Security, Colombia is the fourth-leading source country of illegal immigration to the United States. According to its estimates, the number of illegal Colombian residents in the United States almost tripled from 51,000 in 1990 to 141,000 in 2000. According to the US Census Bureau, the number of authorized Colombian immigrants in the United States in 2006 was 801,363.

Colombia rejects threats and blackmail of the United States of America after the threat of Donald Trump to decertify the country as a partner in counter-narcotics efforts.

See also
 List of diplomatic missions in Colombia
 List of diplomatic missions of Colombia
 Security issues in Colombia

References